William L. Johnson is an American actor and musician who has held starring and prominent roles in many theatrically released projects, including Blue Hill Avenue, Motives 1, Motives 2, Mannsfield 12, Crossover, Doing Hard Time and Tears of a Clown.

Johnson has also acted in several independent short films and features. He also performed in Showtime's A Spider's Web with Stephen Baldwin and Carrie Weir.

As a musician, Johnson has released an album under the persona of "Brotha Bill" called "BrothaBill- Underground Funky Street Soul Brotha".  The music falls under the Neo soul, R&B and funk categories.

Soon after graduation from Emerson Visual and Performing Arts High School, he formed a group "Black to Black", supported by manager Jimmy Newton. In 1999, Johnson and producer/engineer Booker T. Jones conceived "BaldHeadDread", which garnered significant exposure when they scored the movie soundtrack for Ragdoll.

Film

Television
The Steve Harvey Show   as The Emcee (2001)
All of Us   as Brian (2007)

References

External links

William L. Johnson at TV Guide

American soul singers
American male singers
African-American male actors
American male actors
Living people
Year of birth missing (living people)
21st-century African-American male singers